Pseudopachybrachius guttus is a species of dirt-colored seed bug in the family Rhyparochromidae, found in Southeast Asia and Oceania.

References

External links

 

Rhyparochromidae